This pages shows recent rosters of the professional basketball club Apollo Amsterdam based in Amsterdam, Netherlands.

2012-2013

Results
 Dutch Basketball League: 9th
 NBB Cup: Quarterfinals
Roster

2013-2014

Results
 Dutch Basketball League: 8th + Quarterfinalist
 NBB Cup: Round of 16
Roster

2014-2015
Results
NBB Cup: Round of 16

2020–21